Eric Hamilton Davis (18 September 1917 – 2 February 2001) was a rugby union player who represented Australia. Davis, a prop, was born in Abbey Wood, Kent and claimed a total of 4 international rugby caps for Australia.

References

Australian rugby union players
Australia international rugby union players
1917 births
2001 deaths
Rugby union players from Kent
Rugby union props